DNA Repair is a peer-reviewed scientific journal that covers cellular responses to DNA damage. Published monthly since January 2002 by Elsevier as the continuation of Mutation Research/DNA Repair, with Samuel H. Wilson as editor in chief. The journal publishes original research papers, short reviews, and book reviews concerning DNA repair, cell cycle regulation, cell death, and other biological responses to genetic damage.

According to the Journal Citation Reports, its 2020 impact factor is 4.913.

References

External links 
 

Molecular and cellular biology journals
Toxicology journals
English-language journals
Elsevier academic journals
Monthly journals
Publications established in 2002
DNA repair